Shadrack Kobedi (born 20 November 1995) is a South African soccer player who plays as a midfielder for  South African Premier Division side Bloemfontein Celtic.

Club career
He joined TS Sporting on loan from Bloemfontein Celtic in January 2020, on a deal until the end of the season.

References

Living people
1995 births
South African soccer players
Association football midfielders
Bloemfontein Celtic F.C. players
TS Sporting F.C. players
Royal AM F.C. players
South African Premier Division players
National First Division players